Mercury – Act 1 is the fifth studio album by American pop rock band Imagine Dragons, released on September 3, 2021, by Kidinakorner and Interscope Records in the United States. Imagine Dragons recorded the album in 2018 after the previous album Origins. The album was executive produced by Rick Rubin. The album's successor was released on July 1, 2022, titled Mercury – Acts 1 & 2, which Act 1 also appears on.

Background
Following the conclusion of their Evolve World Tour in 2018, Imagine Dragons' fourth studio album Origins was released that November. Unlike their previous albums, the band did not tour in promotion of Origins, instead opting to take time off to decompress and spend time with family.

The album was announced on June 30, 2021, revealing the cover art and release date. 

On September 2, 2021, the band performance in Brooklyn for a small group of people playing 5 songs, including the tracks "Easy Come Easy Go" "It's Ok" and "One Day". On November 19, 2021, the group released an Amazon Music-exclusive EP titled "Mercury - Act 1 (Amazon Music Live)", which included recordings of the 5 songs performed.

Concept 
Frontman Dan Reynolds described the album as split into two sides: one organic and looking inward, the other more aggressive and looking outward. The album touches on themes of loss, loneliness, and grief, while celebrating life:"I have watched my friends die to drug addiction. [...] The point of art is to share our darkest moments as well as the light ones. I believe that by singing about my own struggle with it, it hopefully will bring someone else some sort of peace or resolve. This record deals with a lot of searching and loneliness, struggling with the finite state of reality. However, I really wanted it to end on a celebratory note. Setting the foundation for a more steady and stable future. I wanted to end the record by focusing on all the things that make me happy. The simple things that keep me going every day. Looking to the future. Pointing out to myself all the beauty that surrounds me."The album's name is derived from the word “mercurial”, drawing on Reynolds’ mental health struggles and the band's lack of specific genre classification. The band enlisted Rick Rubin as the album's executive producer, whom Reynolds credited with pushing him to be less metaphorical lyrically and embrace the more “uncomfortable” aspects of songs: "Rick reminded me that over the last decade my fans have grown up with me. They not only want to grow with me, but they expected it. He told me to never worry about pushing them in uncomfortable ways. And that I really would be doing them a disservice if I ever tried to re-create the past or sugarcoat the present. I owe them vulnerability and honesty only."

Critical reception

The album was met with mixed reviews. The more positive reviews praised the album's maturity, calling it the band's best album since their debut, Night Visions. Other negative reviews criticized the band's attempts to mix too many genres.

Neil Z. Yeung of AllMusic stated "While the overall tone and narrative could use a little polishing, Mercury: Act 1 is a huge step forward in their maturation process". Conversely Evan Rytlewski of Pitchfork, was hard-pressed to find signs of maturity and unimpressed by the band’s "genre hopping". He concluded that "despite the ostensibly humanizing presence of Rick Rubin, rock's patron saint of prestige, these quintessentially Vegas showmen still sound like they're firing their emotions out of a T-shirt cannon." 

El Hunt of NME gave the album two stars pointing out its lack of cohesion and originality. David Smyth of Evening Standard called the album "more irritating than inspiring" and stated that "there are a few songs you might like here, but a few you'll violently hate."

Promotion
After the band's break in 2019 - 2020 on March 3, 2021, the band published a photo of them in a studio recording on official accounts. On March 5, the band published a video of cassette with a mystery melody. The next 3 days they published four videos with anagram. When the fans solved the riddles Imagine Dragons confirmed the new double single "Follow You + Cutthroat" would in fact be released on March 12, 2021. On March 23, the band performing for the first time the song "Follow You" on The Late Show. The second performing of the single in TV was on The Ellen Show on May 24, 2021. On June 29, the band published a snipped of the second single titled "Wrecked". On June 30, the band confirmed fifth album "Mercury - Act 1". On September 2, 2021, the band performance on Amazon Music Live for a small group. On 19 November 2021, the group released an Amazon Music-exclusive EP titled "Mercury - Act 1 (Amazon Music Live)". On September 7, the band tuned in to Jimmy Kimmel Live.

World tour 
On 7 September 2021, after the release of Mercury - Act 1, Imagine Dragons officially announced the Mercury Tour in 2022 to promote the album. The band had not toured for their previous album, Origins, as they had decided to break. The tour began on February 6, 2022 in Miami, Florida and is scheduled to conclude on February 4, 2023 in South Africa. Also the frontman of the band Dan Reynolds on July 17, 2022 published on Twitter that they announced many more dates worldwide.

Singles 
The album's double-sided lead single, "Follow You" / "Cutthroat", was released on 12 March, 2021. The music video for "Follow You" came out on March 16, 2021 and "Cutthroat"'s music video came out on May 5, 2021.  The second single "Wrecked", which was inspired by the death of Reynolds' sister-in-law, was released on July 2, 2021 and the music video was released on July 15, 2021. The music video for "Monday" was released on September 24, 2021. "Lonely" was sent to Italian radio as the album's fourth single on the same day.

The theme song from the Arcane League of Legends soundtrack, "Enemy", was released on October 28, 2021 as a promotional single with an animated video.

Track listing

Personnel 
Some credits below were taken from the official photobook of the band in physical versions

Dan Reynolds – lead vocals, guitars, keyboards, production, composition, programming
Wayne Sermon – guitars, piano, backing vocals, synthesizer, production, composition, mixing ("Dull Knives"), programming
Ben McKee – bass guitar, backing vocals, production, composition
Daniel Platzman – drums, percussion, backing vocals, production, composition

 Rick Rubin – executive producer, production
 Dylan Neustadter – engineering
 Jason Lader – engineering
 Jesse Shatkin – production, composition, engineering
 Joel Little – production, composition, engineering
 Jonathan Pfarr – engineering
 Matthew Sedivy – engineering
 Mattman & Robin – production, composition, engineering
 Micah Natera – engineering
 Samuel Dent – engineering
 Brandon Darner – production
 Justin Tranter – composition
 Andrew Tolman (Goldwiing) – production, composition
 Kaelyn Behr (Styalz Fuego) – production, composition
 Mark Benedicto (New Haven) – production, composition
 Jayson DeZuzio – production, composition
 Aja Volkman – composition
 Elley Duhé – composition
 Fran Hall – composition
 Jason Suwito – production, composition
 Dylan Wiggins – production, composition
 John Hanes – engineering
 Randy Merrill – mastering
 Serban Ghenea – mixing all song except "Dull Knives"

Matt Maitland - Big Active, London
Band Photography - Neil Krug

Commercial performance 
Mercury – Act 1 debuted at No. 9 on Billboard 200 with 31,000 equivalent album units (17,000 pure), becoming their fifth top ten album in the US. The album also debuted within the top five across several Billboard charts: Top Rock Albums (No. 2), Alternative Albums (No. 2), Top Album Sales (No. 4) and Top Current Album Sales (No. 4).

Charts

Weekly charts

Year-end charts

Certifications

Release history

Notes

References

2021 albums
Imagine Dragons albums
Interscope Records albums
Kidinakorner albums
Albums produced by Joel Little
Albums produced by Rick Rubin